Henry Hulme "Hal" Sevier (March 16, 1878 – March 10, 1940) was an American diplomat. He served as United States Ambassador to Chile from 1933 to 1935.

Early life
Sevier was born on March 16, 1878, in Columbia, Tennessee.

Career
Sevier was a newspaper editor in his home state until 1895, when he founded the Austin American newspaper in Texas. He served as the editor until 1918. During World War I, he was chairman of the committee responsible for distributing public information to Argentina and Chile.

He served as United States Ambassador to Chile from 1933 to 1935.

Personal life and death
Sevier married Clara Driscoll on July 31, 1906. The couple divorced on July 7, 1937

Sevier died on March 10, 1940, in Chattanooga, Tennessee.

References

External links

Ambassadors of the United States to Chile
1878 births
1940 deaths
People from Columbia, Tennessee
Journalists from Tennessee
Editors of Tennessee newspapers
Editors of Texas newspapers